Nacoleia vittifera is a moth in the family Crambidae. It was described by George Hampson in 1899. It is found in Indonesia (Ambon Island) and Papua New Guinea, where it has been recorded from the D'Entrecasteaux Islands (Fergusson Island).

References

Nacoleia
Endemic fauna of Papua New Guinea
Moths of Papua New Guinea
Moths of Indonesia
Moths described in 1899